The surname is Ches Husna; the given name is Azhari.

Che Husna Azhari (born 8 November 1955) in Kota Bharu, Melor, Kelantan, is a Malaysian writer of literature.

Biography
Che Husna received a degree from Tunku Kurshiah College, Seremban in 1973, and her A Levels from Oxford College of Further Education in 1975.

In 1979, she received a degree from Brunel University of West London in Polymer technology.  In 1985, Che Husna was awarded a PhD in Response Engineering from Brunel University of West London.

Che Husna is a professor at the Faculty of Engineering and Built Environment, at Universiti Kebangsaan Malaysia, specialising in non-metallic materials processing.  She also serves as the Director of the Center for Corporate Planning and Communications at that university.

Che Husna’s writings are generally set in Kelantan, Malaysia, and her best known short stories are used as standard teaching texts in Malaysia.

Her first English anthology, An Anthology of Kelantan Tales was published in 1992. Her latest work, An English Sojourn is set in the United Kingdom.

She lives in Pinggiran, Putrajaya.

Works
 An English Sojourn. Selangor, Malaysia: Furada Publishing House, 2008. 
 The Rambutan Orchard. Bangi: Furada Publishing House, 1993 
 Puisi Ambo. Furada Publishing House, 1995
 Kelantan Tales: An Anthology of Short Stories, Furada Publishing House, 1992

References
 https://web.archive.org/web/20100524020017/http://www.ukm.my/PORTAL/news181108.html
 https://web.archive.org/web/20110722232316/http://asiatic.iium.edu.my/v3n1/article/Amin_Malak/Amin_Malak.pdf
 

Malaysian writers
Malaysian non-fiction writers
Malaysian short story writers
1955 births
Living people
Malaysian women writers
Women non-fiction writers
Malaysian women short story writers
Academic staff of the National University of Malaysia
English-language writers from Malaysia
People from Kelantan
20th-century Malaysian writers
21st-century Malaysian writers
20th-century non-fiction writers
21st-century non-fiction writers
20th-century Malaysian women writers
21st-century Malaysian women writers